Nephroselmidaceae is a family of green algae, the only family in the order Nephroselmidales and the class Nephrophyceae within the division Chlorophyta.

References

Green algae families
Nephrophyceae